Gomphocerus sibiricus is a species of insect belonging to the family Acrididae subfamily Gomphocerinae.It is found across the Palearctic east to Siberia.The main distribution area is Siberia. In Central and Southern Europe it is limited to the high mountains: Pyrenees and Sierra de Guadarrama, central and southern Apennines, Alps, Carpathians, Balkan Mountains and the Caucasus.

References

Gomphocerinae
Orthoptera of Asia
Orthoptera of Europe
Taxa named by Carl Linnaeus
Insects described in 1767